The Alabama Museum of the Health Sciences was opened and dedicated at the UAB campus in 1975.  It was developed to display the health sciences in the areas of education, research, and practice in the U.S. with special emphasis on the state of Alabama and its contributors to the practice of medicine.  It houses a combined collection of rare and important medical books and manuscripts—dating to the Middle Ages—and equipment, instruments, and objects from the health sciences.  It also houses manuscript collections with an emphasis on the health science fields.

External links
Alabama Museum of the Health Sciences

University of Alabama at Birmingham
University museums in Alabama
Science museums in Alabama
Museums in Birmingham, Alabama
Medical museums in Alabama
Museums established in 1975
1975 establishments in Alabama